Ralph du Vergier Truman (7 May 1900 – 15 October 1977) was an English actor, usually cast as either a villain or an authority figure. He possessed a distinguished speaking voice. He was born in London, England.

Truman originally studied at the Royal College of Music and was a regular performer on the radio from 1925, appearing in an estimated 5,000 broadcasts.

His best-remembered film roles include Tigellinus in MGM's  Quo Vadis (1951), the French herald Mountjoy in Laurence Olivier's film Henry V (1944), the evil Monks in David Lean's Oliver Twist (1948), George Merry in the Walt Disney version of Treasure Island (1950), and the Police Inspector in Alfred Hitchcock's The Man Who Knew Too Much (1956). He also appeared in episodes of several TV series, including Danger Man.

He died 15 October 1977 in Ipswich, Suffolk aged 77.

Selected filmography

 City of Song (1931) (uncredited)
 The Bells (1931) as Blacksmith
 The Shadow (1933) as Elliot
 The Perfect Flaw (1934) as Richard Drexel
 Lieut. Daring R.N. (1935) as Mung
 D'Ye Ken John Peel? (1935) as 1st Ruffian Footman
 The Lad (1935) as O'Shea (uncredited)
 Three Witnesses (1935) as Bellman
 That's My Uncle (1935) as Monty
 The Case of Gabriel Perry (1935) as Inspector White
 The Silent Passenger (1935) as Saunders
 Jubilee Window (1935) as Dan Stevens
 Father O'Flynn (1935) as Fawcett
 Late Extra (1935) as Minor Role (uncredited)
 Captain Bill (1936) as Red
 Mr. Cohen Takes a Walk (1936) as Sam Cohen
 The Crimson Circle (1936) as Lawrence Fuller
 The Marriage of Corbal (1936) as Charles
 The Gay Adventure (1936) as Buck
 East Meets West (1936) as Abdul
 Fire Over England (1937) as Spanish Inquisition Representative (uncredited)
 Secret Lives (1937) as Prison Guard (uncredited)
 The Lilac Domino (1937) as Doorman (uncredited)
 Under the Red Robe (1937) as Captain at Castle
 Silver Blaze (1937) as Bert Prince
 Change for a Sovereign (1937) as Archduke Paul
 Dinner at the Ritz (1937) as Auctioneer
 It's a Grand Old World (1937) as Banks
 South Riding (1938) as Nursing Home Doctor (uncredited)
 The Drum (1938) as Dinner Guest (uncredited)
 The Challenge (1938) as Giordano
 Many Tanks Mr. Atkins (1938) as Zanner
 Life of St. Paul (1938) as Orderly
 The Outsider (1939) as Sir Nathan Israel
 Black Eyes (1939) as Diner
 The Saint in London (1939) as Kussella
 Just like a Woman (1939) as Maharajah
 The Seventh Survivor (1942) as Captain
 Sabotage at Sea (1942) as Horace Chandler
 The Butler's Dilemma (1943) as Bishop
 Henry V (1944) as Mountjoy, The French Herald
 Lisbon Story (1946) as Police Commissionaire
 Beware of Pity (1946) as Maj. Sandor Balinkay
 The Laughing Lady (1946) as Lord Mandeville
 Woman to Woman (1947) as Colonel
 Dusty Bates (1947) as Merryvale
 Mrs. Fitzherbert (1947) as Richard Brinsley Sheridan
 Oliver Twist (1948) as Monks
 Mr. Perrin and Mr. Traill (1948) as Comber
 Eureka Stockade (1949) as Gov. Hotham
 Christopher Columbus (1949) as Captain
 The Interrupted Journey (1949) as Inspector Waterson
 The Reluctant Widow (1950) as Scowler
 Treasure Island (1950) as George Merry
 Quo Vadis (1951) as Tigellinus
 The Golden Coach (1952) as Duc de Castro
 Malta Story (1953) as Vice Adm Willie Banks
 The Master of Ballantrae (1953) as Maj. Clarendon
 Knights of the Round Table (1953) as King Marr (uncredited)
 Beau Brummell (1954) as Sir Ralph Sidley
 The Night My Number Came Up (1955) as Wainwright
 The Ship That Died of Shame (1955) as Sir Richard
 Tons of Trouble (1956) as Inspector Bridger
 The Black Tent (1956) as Maj. Croft
 The Man Who Knew Too Much (1956) as Inspector Buchanan
 Wicked as They Come (1956) as John Dowling
 The Long Arm (1956) as Colonel Blenkinsop
 The Silken Affair (1956) as Minor Role (uncredited)
 The Good Companions (1957) as Memsford
 Yangtse Incident: The Story of H.M.S. Amethyst (1957) as Vice-Admiral
 The Spaniard's Curse (1958) as Sir Robert Wyvern
 Beyond This Place (1959) as Sir Matthew Sprott
 Ben-Hur (1959) as Aide to Tiberius (uncredited)
 Under Ten Flags (1960) as Admiral Benson
 Exodus (1960) as Colonel
 El Cid (1961) as King Ferdinand
 Nicholas and Alexandra (1971) as Rodzianko
 Lady Caroline Lamb (1972) as Admiral

References

External links
 
 

1900 births
1977 deaths
English male stage actors
English male film actors
English male television actors
English male radio actors
Male actors from London
20th-century English male actors